Ella Iris Dederick (born July 27, 1996) is an American professional soccer player who plays as a goalkeeper for the Houston Dash of the National Women's Soccer League (NWSL).

Club career 
Dederick made her NWSL debut on May 30, 2021.

On December 22, 2021, Dederick was traded to the Houston Dash.

References

External links 
 
 Washington State profile

1996 births
Living people
OL Reign players
Washington State Cougars women's soccer players
National Women's Soccer League players
American women's soccer players
Women's association football goalkeepers